S.H.E is a Taiwanese girl group that specializes in pop music, and consists of Selina Ren, Hebe Tian, and Ella Chen. Over the course of their career, the trio has not only released nine albums, but have also hosted several television programs and acted in numerous dramas.

Sign 
x is participate in filmography for members of S.H.E

Television Hosting

Drama Series

Movies Series

Notes and references

Filmography